The Chief of the Naval Staff (India), also known as the Navy Chief (abbreviated to CNS), is a statutory position in the Indian Armed Forces held by a four star admiral. As the highest ranking officer to serve solely in the Indian Navy, the chief is the operational head of the Indian Navy and the principal naval adviser to the Minister of Defence. The CNS, in a separate capacity, is also a member of the National Security Council and thereby an advisor to the president and the prime minister. The CNS is typically the most senior naval officer in the Indian Armed Forces as the military leader of the naval forces, unless the Chairman Chiefs of Staff Committee is a naval officer.

The CNS heads the military staff of the Indian Navy and advises both the president of the Republic and the prime minister on naval affairs. The current CNS is Admiral R. Hari Kumar. The 25th Navy Chief, he took over from Karambir Singh, who retired on 30 November 2021 after four decades of service from the navy.

Office of the Chief of the Naval Staff
At Independence, the head of the Navy was designated the "Commander-in-Chief, Royal Indian Navy."  On 21 June 1948, the title of "Chief of the Naval Staff" was added, with a  re-designation to "Chief of the Naval Staff and Commander-in-Chief, Royal Indian Navy".

The "Royal" designation was dropped when India became a republic on 26 January 1950.  Thus re-designating the head of Indian Navy to "Chief of the Naval Staff and Commander-in-Chief, Indian Navy".

The "Commanders-In-Chief (Change in Designation) Act, 1955" re-designated the head of Indian Navy to "Chief of the Naval Staff". The post was held by a three-star rank Vice Admiral until 1968, when it was upgraded to the four-star rank of a full Admiral.

Appointments to the office are made by the Appointments Committee of the Cabinet (ACC). The Chief of the Naval Staff generally reaches superannuation upon serving three years or at the age of 62, whichever is earlier.

Appointees

Commander-in-Chief, Royal Indian Navy (1947–1948)

Chief of the Naval Staff and Commander-in-Chief, Royal Indian Navy (1948–1950)

Chief of the Naval Staff and Commander-in-Chief, Indian Navy (1950–1955)

Chief of the Naval Staff (1955–present)

See also
 Royal Indian Navy Commanders - for the naval chiefs before 1950
 Vice Chief of the Naval Staff
 Chief of the Air Staff
 Chief of the Army Staff
 Chief of Defence Staff
 Chairman of the Chiefs of Staff Committee
 Chief of Integrated Defence Staff
 Chief of the General Staff
 Commander-in-Chief of India
 List of serving admirals of the Indian Navy

References

 
India
Indian military appointments
Indian Navy appointments